Oediplexia is a genus of moths of the family Noctuidae. The genus was erected by George Hampson in 1908.

Species
Oediplexia citrophila Berio, 1962 (from Aldabra / Seychelles)
Oediplexia mesophaea Hampson, 1908 (from Tanzania)

References

Amphipyrinae